The Piano Scene of Ahmad Jamal is an album by American jazz pianist Ahmad Jamal. It contains performances from his earliest recording sessions for Okeh in 1951–52 in Chicago, and an Epic session from October 1955 in New York, NY.  It includes additional selections from the sessions where the 1956 album The Ahmad Jamal Trio was recorded.  The album was re-released in 2005 with additional tracks.

Track listing

1959 Edition
 "Old Devil Moon"	
 "Ahmad's Blues"	
 "Poinciana" (The Song of the Tree)
 "Billy Boy"
 "Will You Still Be Mine"
 "Pavanne"
 "Crazy He Calls Me"
 "The Surrey With The Fringe On Top"
 "Aki and Ukthay" (Brother and Sister)
 "Slaughter On 10th Avenue"
 "A Gal in Calico"
 "It's Easy to Remember"

2005 Edition
 "The Surrey With The Fringe On Top"
 "Will You Still Be Mine"
 "Ahmad's Blues"
 "A Gal in Calico"
 "Aki and Ukthay"
 "Billy Boy"
 "Black Beauty"
 "Love for Sale"
 "Something to Remember You By"
 "Poinciana"
 "Don't Blame Me"
 "Autumn Leaves"
 "They Can't Take That Away From Me"
 "Old Devil Moon"
 "It's Easy to Remember"
 "Squeeze Me"
 "Crazy He Calls Me"
 "Pavanne"
 "Perfidia"
 "Rica Pulpa"
 "The Donkey Serenade"

Personnel
Ahmad Jamal - piano
Ray Crawford - guitar
Eddie Calhoun, Israel Crosby - double bass

References 

Ahmad Jamal albums
1959 albums